His New Profession is a 1914 American comedy silent film made at the Keystone Studios and starring Charlie Chaplin. The film involves Chaplin taking care of a man in a wheelchair. It is also known as "The Good for Nothing".

Synopsis
The Tramp is hired by a man to wheel his invalid uncle around a seaside park for a while. Although he begins his new job with enthusiasm, the Tramp soon thinks he should be earning extra money for his efforts to spend at a nearby saloon. Accordingly, he takes a beggar's sign and tin and puts them on the wheelchair of the man he is taking care of. As soon as someone puts money into the tin, the Tramp takes the money and spends it at the saloon. The film ends in chaos that involves the Tramp, a pretty girl, the beggar, two park policemen, the old man, and the old man's nephew.

Review
Motion Picture News commented, "Charlie Chaplin appears in this picture and, as usual, whenever he appears it is a laugh throughout."

Cast
 Charlie Chaplin as The Tramp
 Charley Chase as Nephew
 Cecile Arnold as Woman with eggs
 Harry McCoy as Policeman
 Roscoe Arbuckle as Bartender 
 Helen Carruthers as Pretty girl (uncredited)
 Charles Murray as Drinker (uncredited)
 Vivian Edwards as Nurse (uncredited)
 Jess Dandy as Invalid uncle

See also
Charlie Chaplin filmography
List of American films of 1914

External links

 
 
 

1914 films
1914 comedy films
Short films directed by Charlie Chaplin
American black-and-white films
Silent American comedy films
American silent short films
Keystone Studios films
Films produced by Mack Sennett
Articles containing video clips
1914 short films
American comedy short films
Mutual Film films
1910s American films